Russell Edward Brand (born 4 June 1975) is an English comedian and actor. He is known for his flamboyant, loquacious style and manner. Brand has received three British Comedy Awards: Best Newcomer (2006), Best Live Stand-Up (2008), and the award for Outstanding Contribution to Comedy (2011).

After beginning his career as a comedian and later becoming an MTV presenter in the UK, in 2004 Brand gained a role as the host of Big Brother's Big Mouth, a Big Brother spin-off. In 2007, he had his first major film role in St Trinian's, and the following year he landed a major role in the romantic comedy-drama Forgetting Sarah Marshall; the film led to him starring in a spin off, the rock comedy Get Him to the Greek, alongside Jonah Hill in 2010. He also worked as a voice actor in the animated films Despicable Me in 2010, Hop in 2011, and Despicable Me 2 in 2013, and played the title character of the 2011 remake of the romantic comedy Arthur. In 2013, he released the successful stand-up special Messiah Complex.

Since guest-editing an edition of British political weekly New Statesman in 2013, Brand has become known as a public activist and campaigner, and has spoken on a wide range of political and cultural issues, including wealth inequality, addiction, corporate capitalism, climate change, and media bias. In 2014, he launched his political-comedy web series The Trews, released a book entitled Revolution, and began work on a documentary about financial inequality with Michael Winterbottom.

Over the course of his career, Brand has been the subject of frequent media coverage and controversy for issues such as his promiscuity, drug use and political views, his outrageous behaviour at various award ceremonies, his dismissal from MTV and resignation from the BBC, and his two-year marriage to American singer Katy Perry. He has incorporated many of his controversial public acts into his comedic material. A biographical documentary called Brand: A Second Coming was released in 2015.

Early life
Russell Edward Brand was born in Orsett Hospital in Grays, Essex, England. He is the only child of Barbara Elizabeth (née Nichols) and photographer Ronald Henry Brand. Brand's parents separated when he was six months old, and he was raised by his mother.

When Brand was 8, his mother was diagnosed with uterine cancer and then breast cancer one year later. While she underwent treatment, Brand lived with relatives. When he was 14, he suffered from bulimia nervosa. When he was 16, he left home because of disagreements with his mother's partner. Brand then started to use illegal drugs such as cannabis, amphetamines, LSD, and ecstasy. Brand was sexually abused by a tutor.

Brand says he had a "strange relationship" with his father, whom he saw sporadically and who took him to visit prostitutes during a trip to Thailand when Brand was a teenager. He made his theatrical debut at the age of 15 in a school production of Bugsy Malone, and then began work as a film extra. Brand attended Grays School and in 1991, he was accepted to the Italia Conti Academy and had his first year of tuition funded by Essex County Council. After his first year at Italia Conti Academy, Brand was expelled for illegal drug use and poor attendance.

Career

Stand-up
Brand performed stand-up at the Hackney Empire New Act of the Year final in 2000. Although he finished fourth, his performance attracted the attention of Bound and Gagged Comedy Ltd agent Nigel Klarfeld. That year, he also made his Edinburgh Festival Fringe debut as one-third of the stand-up show Pablo Diablo's Cryptic Triptych, alongside ventriloquist Mark Felgate and Anglo-Iranian comic Shappi Khorsandi. In 2004, he took his first one-man show, the confessional Better Now, to the Edinburgh Festival, giving what he claimed was an honest account of his heroin addiction. He returned the following year with Eroticised Humour. He launched his first nationwide tour, Shame, in 2006. Brand drew on embarrassing incidents in his own life and the coverage about him in the tabloid press. The show was released on DVD as Russell Brand: Live. Brand appeared in a sketch and performed stand-up at Amnesty International's Secret Policeman's Ball in 2006 and again at the 2012 edition at Radio City Music Hall.

In March 2007, he co-hosted an evening of the Teenage Cancer Trust gigs with Noel Fielding. In December 2007, Brand performed for Queen Elizabeth II and Prince Philip as an act in the 2007 Royal Variety Performance. His second nationwide tour, in 2007, was called Russell Brand: Only Joking and released on DVD as Russell Brand: Doin' Life. Brand began performing in the US, and recorded a special for Comedy Central titled Russell Brand in New York, which aired in March 2009. In October, a further four dates that were performed in November were added to raise money for Focus 12, the drug charity for which Brand was a patron until it closed.

In 2013, Brand presented and toured his comedy show Messiah Complex, in which he tackled advertising, the laws on drug addiction and the portrayal of his heroes, such as Gandhi, Guevara, Malcolm X and Jesus, and how he is, in comically contrived ways, similar to them.

In January 2017, Brand announced his new tour Re:Birth, which debuted in April 2017 and was meant to go through November 2018. However, on 30 April 2018, he was forced to cancel the remaining dates after his mother was critically injured in a hit-and-run accident. Russell Brand: Re:Birth, which was filmed in London in April 2018, was released as a standup comedy film on Netflix on 4 December 2018.

Over the years, Brand has named Richard Pryor, Bill Hicks, Peter Cook, Lenny Bruce, Tony Hancock, Jack Kerouac, Stewart Lee, Tenacious D, Eddie Murphy, and Monty Python among his comedic influences. In choosing one comedy film among his five favourite movies he picked Monty Python's Life of Brian. In 2009, he appeared in the television documentary, Monty Python: Almost the Truth (Lawyers Cut).

Presenting
Brand's first presenting role came in 2000 as a video journalist on MTV: he presented Dancefloor Chart, touring nightclubs in Britain and Ibiza, and hosted the tea-time request show Select. Brand was fired several days after coming to work dressed as Osama bin Laden the day after the 11 September 2001 attacks and bringing his drug dealer to the MTV studios.
After leaving MTV, Brand starred in RE:Brand, a documentary and comedy television program that aimed to take a challenging look at cultural taboos. It was conceived, written, and hosted by Brand, with the help of his comic partner on many projects, Matt Morgan. The series was shown on the now-defunct digital satellite channel UK Play in 2002.

In 2004, he hosted Big Brother's Eforum on E4, a sister show to Big Brother 5. The show gave celebrity guests and the public the chance to have their say on the goings-on inside the Big Brother house. For Big Brother 6, the show's name changed to Big Brother's Big Mouth. Following Celebrity Big Brother 5, Brand said he would not return to host the Big Brother 8 series of Big Brother's Big Mouth. In a statement, Brand thanked all the producers for "taking the risk of employing an ex-junkie twerp" to front the show. Of his time presenting the show, he said, "The three years I've spent on Big Brother's Big Mouth have been an unprecedented joy". Brand hosted a one-off special called Big Brother According to Russell Brand, in which Brand took a surreal, sideways look at Big Brother through the ages. On 8 January 2008, Brand was the fifth celebrity to "hijack" the Big Brother house, in the E4 show Big Brother: Celebrity Hijack.

Brand next returned to MTV in the spring of 2006 as presenter of the chat show, 1 Leicester Square, which had its broadcast time revised to allow for a more adult-oriented theme. Guests included Tom Cruise, Uma Thurman, The Mighty Boosh, and Boy George, and a second series began in September 2006 on MTV. After Big Brother 7 finished, Brand presented a debate show called Russell Brand's Got Issues, on E4. The viewing figures for the first episode were seen as disappointing, being beaten by nearly all of E4's main multi-channel rivals, despite a big publicity and promotional campaign for the show. The poor ratings prompted the network to repackage the show as The Russell Brand Show and move it to Channel 4.

Brand presented the 2006 NME Awards. At the ceremony Bob Geldof, who was accepting an award from Brand, said at the podium, "Russell Brand – what a cunt", to which Brand replied, "Really, it's no surprise [Geldof]'s such an expert on famine. He has, after all, been dining out on 'I Don't Like Mondays' for 30 years." Brand hosted the 2007 BRIT Awards and presented Oasis with an "Outstanding Contribution to Music" award at the event. He also hosted one hour of Comic Relief. On 7 July 2007, he presented at the UK leg of Live Earth at Wembley Stadium, London.

On 12 December 2007, BBC Four aired Russell Brand On the Road, a documentary presented by Brand and Matt Morgan about the writer Jack Kerouac and his novel On the Road. Brand returned to Channel 4 to host Russell Brand's Ponderland, in which he discussed topics like childhood and science through stand-up comedy. The show first aired on 22 October 2007 and continued for the next five nights. A second series began on 30 October 2008. The show ran for 12 episodes over the two series. Brand was later announced as the host of the 2008 MTV Video Music Awards (VMAs), which drew scepticism from the American media, as he was relatively unknown to the American public. Brand's appearance led to controversy for numerous reasons. He said the night "marked the launch of a very new Britney Spears era", referring to it as "the resurrection of [Spears]". He also said, "If there was a female Christ, it's Britney". Brand implored the audience to elect Democratic presidential candidate Barack Obama and later called then–U.S. President George W. Bush "a retarded cowboy fella", who, in England, "wouldn't be trusted with scissors". He also made several references to the purity rings worn by the Jonas Brothers, but apologised for the comments later in the show.

His comments at the 2008 MTV VMAs led to Brand receiving death threats from some offended viewers. Brand claimed that MTV asked him to host the 2009 awards after the ratings for the 2008 show were 20 percent higher than the previous year. Also in 2008, Brand hosted a one-off stand up comedy show called Comedy Live Presents: Russell Brand and Friends, which was shown on Channel 4 on 25 January 2008. Brand returned to host the 2009 MTV VMAs, on 13 September 2009, at Radio City Music Hall in New York City. The ratings for the 2009 show were the best since the 2004 VMAs. On 12 February 2011, Brand guest hosted an episode of the hit American sketch comedy Saturday Night Live. In 2012 he hosted the MTV Movie Awards and Brand X with Russell Brand, a late-night talk show on FX that received lukewarm reviews and middling ratings. The show was cancelled in 2013 after running for two seasons.

Acting
In 1994, while still a teenager, Brand appeared in episodes of The Bill and the children's adventure series Mud. In 2002, Brand appeared on the TV shows Cruise of the Gods and White Teeth. In 2005, he played Tommy in the BBC sitcom Blessed, which was written and directed by Ben Elton. Brand auditioned for the part of Super Hans in the Channel 4 sitcom Peep Show; the role eventually went to Matt King. In 2007, Brand appeared in Cold Blood for ITV, playing an ex-con called Ally. Brand played a recovering crack addict named Terry in the pilot for the ITV comedy The Abbey, written by Morwenna Banks. He voiced an Earth Guardian in Robbie the Reindeer in Close Encounters of the Herd Kind. Brand appeared in a small role in the 2006 movie Penelope; although his first major film role was as Flash Harry in the 2007 film St Trinian's.

Brand achieved American fame when he starred in the 2008 film Forgetting Sarah Marshall, in which he played rock star Aldous Snow, the boyfriend of the title character (played by Kristen Bell). Brand received rave reviews for his performance as Snow, and he revealed the character was changed from an author to a rock star because of his audition. Brand starred alongside Adam Sandler in the Disney film Bedtime Stories, which was released on 25 December 2008. He reprised the role of Aldous Snow for a buddy comedy titled Get Him to the Greek, co-starring Jonah Hill. He reunited with Forgetting Sarah Marshall director Nicholas Stoller and producer Judd Apatow for the film.

Brand starred in Julie Taymor's 2010 version of William Shakespeare's The Tempest, as Trinculo. In 2010, Brand voiced Dr. Nefario in the Universal movie Despicable Me, and reprised the role in the 2013 sequel. Brand also guest starred in The Simpsons episode "Angry Dad: The Movie" as himself. Brand also starred in the April 2011 live action/CGI animated film Hop with James Marsden, voicing the film's protagonist E.B. Hop opened at number one at the Friday box office in the US, earning $11.4 million. The same month, he played the title character in a remake of Arthur, written by Peter Baynham, which was a box office disappointment. Brand starred as Lonny in a film adaptation of the 1980s-set musical Rock Of Ages, released in cinemas in June 2012.

After appearing as William Carr in the Diablo Cody film Paradise (2013), Brand went on hiatus from acting. His return role was as Creek in the DreamWorks animated film Trolls (2016), followed by his portrayal of God in the comedy Army of One (2016) with Nicolas Cage. In 2018 and 2019, he portrayed Sports X Network founder Lance Klians in a recurring arc In the last two seasons of the HBO series Ballers. Brand appeared as Tristan Trent in the 2020 fantasy film Four Kids and It, and in 2022 played Linus Windlesham in Kenneth Branagh's remake of Death on the Nile.

Other projects Brand has been tied to include a remake of Drop Dead Fred, an Adam Sandler-produced film about a con-man posing as a priest tentatively entitled Bad Father, co-written by Brand and Matt Morgan; and a film adaptation of the children's television programme Rentaghost a project that was picked up by Fox Studios in 2011 with Ben Stiller attached.

Production
As of October 2008, Brand's own production company is called Vanity Projects. The company's most recent production, Russell Brand Doing Life, was released in 2009.

Brand also established his own production company in 2011 with friend Nik Linnen. Called 'Branded Films', the company operates from the Warner Bros. studios in Burbank, California, United States. The company's primary focus is to develop films that Brand stars in.

Radio

Brand's radio career began in early 2002, when he hosted a Sunday afternoon show with Matt Morgan on London's Indie Rock station Xfm. Brand was fired from the job after reading pornographic material live on-air. In 2005, Brand co-hosted three one-off shows on BBC Radio 6 Music with Karl Pilkington. In November 2006, the show transferred to BBC Radio 2 and aired on Saturdays from 9–11 pm. The show regularly drew about 400,000 listeners. In an episode of the show broadcast on 18 October 2008, Brand and fellow Radio 2 DJ Jonathan Ross made a series of phone calls to actor Andrew Sachs in which Brand alleged on air that he had had sex with Sachs' granddaughter. Sunday tabloid The Mail on Sunday broke the story and regarded the phone calls as obscene. Both presenters were later suspended by the BBC because of the incident, and Brand resigned from his show. The BBC was later fined £150,000 by Ofcom, Britain's broadcast regulator, for airing the calls.

Brand returned to radio when he and Noel Gallagher hosted a one-off football talk show on 19 April 2009 for Talksport. Brand returned to Talksport on 9 October 2010, with a Saturday night show that lasted 20 weeks. The show featured clips and back-stage recordings from his Booky Wook 2 promotional tour. Brand was joined by a host of guests, including Noel Gallagher and Jonathan Ross.

Podcast
On 25 February 2015, Brand launched a twice-weekly podcast called The Russell Brand Podcast through audioBoom. The podcast reunited Brand with his radio presenting team of Matt Morgan and poet Mr Gee. The podcast ended after 24 episodes. In 2017, Brand launched a new podcast called Under the Skin with Russell Brand in which he interviews guests from areas such as academia, popular culture and the arts.

Writing
From 2006 until 2009, Brand wrote a column for The Guardian sports section that focused on West Ham United and the England national football team. A collection of the columns from 2006 and 2007 was released in 2007 in his book Irons in the Fire.

Brand's first autobiography, My Booky Wook, was released on 15 November 2007 and received favourable reviews. Andrew Anthony from The Observer commented that "Russell Brand's gleeful tale of drugs and debauchery in My Booky Wook puts most other celebrity memoirs to shame".

Brand signed a £1.8 million two-book deal with HarperCollins in June 2008. The first book, Articles of Faith, examined Brand's philosophy and consisted of a collection of his columns from The Guardian that first appeared there in 2007 and 2008. The book was published on 16 October 2008, and also includes Brand interviewing Noel Gallagher, James Corden, and David Baddiel about football. The second book for HarperCollins, Booky Wook 2: This Time It's Personal, was Brand's second autobiography and was released on 30 September 2010.

Brand has written articles for The Guardian that offer his perspectives on current events and pop culture, including the deaths of Amy Winehouse and Robin Williams. Following the 2011 London riots, Brand wrote a column in which he criticised the government's response to the riots in Summer 2011 as a failure to address the root causes.

Brand made his children's book debut in November 2014 with Russell Brand's Trickster Tales: The Pied Piper of Hamelin. It is the first instalment of an intended series, featuring illustrations by Chris Riddell. In The Guardian, reviewer Lucy Mangan noted: "The on-Brand need to be noticed is there on every page, his unwillingness to get out of the way of the story tripping the reader up at every turn" and adding that Chris Riddell's illustrations "give the book a beauty it does not deserve and a coherence the text does not deliver". Nicholas Tucker, in The Independent, noted the book's "wearingly offensive" language, and commented: "Brand’s take on The Pied Piper of Hamelin is the first of a series of riffs on traditional fairy and folk tales. If they are all as bad as this one, British children’s books will have hit a new low."

His book Revolution, in which Brand develops his earlier ideas, was published by Random House in October 2014 and received much publicity. Nick Cohen of The Observer called Brand's writing "atrocious: long-winded, confused and smug; filled with references to books Brand has half read and thinkers he has half understood." On the other hand, Steve Richards in The Independent commented: "Brand writes and speaks with verve, words flowing effortlessly and musically. The contrast with the tame wooden prose of elected politicians is marked."

In September 2017, Macmillan published Brand's book Recovery: Freedom from Our Addictions. His next book, Mentors: How To Help and Be Helped, was published in January 2019. It deals with the people who have had a positive impact on his life and encourages us to look to others to become better individuals.

Political activism

2009–2012: Early interventions

In January 2009, Brand participated in a celebrity letter to The Independent—as a supporter of the Hoping Foundation—to condemn Israel's assault on Gaza, and the "cruel and massive loss of life of the citizens of Gaza". In February 2009, Brand and several other entertainers wrote to The Times in defence of leaders of the Baháʼí Faith, who were on trial in Iran at the time. In April 2009, he attended the 2009 G-20 London summit protests and spoke to the press.

Brand was selected by the Dalai Lama to host the Buddhist leader's 2012 youth event in Manchester. The Dalai Lama's representatives explained that Brand was selected because he had proved "the power of spirituality to effect change in his own life", while Brand stated to the BBC after the event: "I said yes because he's the living incarnation of Buddha and I thought, if you're around the Dalai Lama, that can only be good for your spiritual quest through life. He's an amazing diplomat, an incredible activist, a wonderful human being and an inspiration to us all."

In April 2012, Brand testified in front of a parliamentary committee about drug addiction, sharing his experiences and view that drugs should be decriminalised. He said, "I'm not a legal expert. I'm saying that, to a drug addict, the legal aspect is irrelevant. If you need to get drugs, you will. The criminal and legal status, I think, sends the wrong message. Being arrested isn't a lesson, it's just an administrative blip." Part of this testimony was included in a BBC Three documentary, Russell Brand: From Addiction to Recovery, that aired in December 2012. Brand said he felt compelled to make the film after the 2011 death of close friend Amy Winehouse, and he also used the opportunity to question how British society "deals with addicts and addiction."

2013: New Statesman, Newsnight

Brand has appeared frequently as a campaigner for serious issues. In June 2013 he appeared in a video in support of Chelsea Manning.

On 23 October 2013, Brand was interviewed by Jeremy Paxman for the BBC's Newsnight in which he disparaged the British political system as ineffectual and encouraged the British electorate not to vote. He was challenged by Paxman about his call for "revolution" and whether someone who had never voted could edit a political magazine. When asked by Paxman what a revolution would look like, Brand replied:

British commentator Joan Smith dismissed Brand's appearance on Newsnight as the "canny self-publicist" who indulges in "waffle about 'revolution'" as "one celebrity, I'm afraid, who's more idiot than savant." Former Independent editor Simon Kelner largely defended his appearance: "It sounded rather attractive, even if it wasn't exactly worked through. But Brand's rhetorical flourishes made up for the lack of detail".

Brand guest-edited a special issue of the New Statesman that was published on 24 October 2013 and explored the theme of Revolution, and in which he explained his objection to the destruction of Earth through greed and exploitation, and called for a change in consciousness to accompany political and economic measures to achieve a more sustainable future.

In November that year Brand joined the Anonymous Million Mask March in London that protested against "cuts, corruption and an increase in state surveillance".

2014–2020: The Trews, Revolution, and political activism

In January 2014, Brand was invited by the Cambridge Union Society to participate in an interview, held in the Union's debating chamber with Leo Kirby, the Union's 2014 Speakers' Officer. The interview ran for more than an hour and was published on the Union's YouTube channel.

Brand launched his YouTube series The Trews: True News with Russell Brand on 27 February 2014, in which he "analyses the news, truthfully, spontaneously and with great risk to his personal freedom." In addition to news analysis, he regularly has guests on the show, including economists, journalists and activists. By the end of the year, more than 200 episodes had been released on the channel. The show was halted for nearly a year as he decided to be away from social media to focus on his personal and professional growth.

In June 2014, he took part in the People's Assembly Against Austerity, that attracted an estimated 50,000 people marching from the BBC office to Westminster. Brand addressed the crowd, saying, "The people of this building [the House of Commons] generally speaking do not represent us, they represent their friends in big business. It's time for us to take back our power. Power isn't there, it is here, within us. The revolution that's required isn't a revolution of radical ideas, but the implementation of ideas we already have."

In September 2014, Brand lent his support to the Fire Brigades Union, giving a speech at the union's rally against cuts in London and asking the public to support the firefighters.

In October 2014, at the time Brand's book Revolution was published, John Lydon (also known as "Johnny Rotten" of the Sex Pistols), in an interview with Polly Toynbee of The Guardian, said that Brand's advocacy of non-voting is "the most idiotic thing I’ve ever heard." In a November 2014 YouGov poll, involving a selection of celebrities, Brand was chosen as the one with the most negative influence on political debate (46%). The poll also found that 60% of poll participants disliked him and 28% liked him.

Shortly afterward, Brand appeared on Newsnight again, but was interviewed by Evan Davis on this occasion. Asked about 9/11 conspiracy theories and whether the attacks were perpetuated by the American government, Brand commented: "[w]e have to remain open-minded to [that] kind of possibility", although this section of the interview ended with Brand insisting that he did not "want to talk about daft conspiracy theories." Hadley Freeman in The Guardian mocked the opinions he expressed in the interview: "I’m not entirely sure where he thinks he’s going to go with this revolution idea because [SPOILER!] revolution is not going to happen."

BBC Three commissioned Brand to make a documentary on the global "War on Drugs", which aired on 26 November 2014. The film, titled Russell Brand: End the Drugs War, shows him exploring the illicit drug policies of other countries in search of a compassionate approach to people who use illicit drugs. Brand said in the documentary, "People think compassion is 'wet liberalism'; it's not, it's pragmatic". Brand worked with the Matchlight Ltd production company, director Ross Wilson and executive producer Liz Hartford.

On 2 December 2014, Brand joined East London residents to protest over the increase in rents at the New Era housing estate. During a protest for the New Era residents, Channel 4 News reporter Paraic O'Brien continually pushed Brand to answer questions about the value of his own property, which is rented. The line of questioning irritated Brand, who ended up calling the reporter a "snide"—the short clip went viral on YouTube.

Later that month, on 11 December, Brand appeared on the BBC's Question Time programme which included the UK Independence Party's leader Nigel Farage as one of the other panellists. Brand called Farage "a pound shop Enoch Powell" on-air, and the two men continued to trade insults after the programme had ended.

In January 2015, during the television show Channel 4's Big Fat Anniversary Quiz, Brand insulted politician Ed Balls. Balls responded by calling Brand a "pound shop Ben Elton." In March, Brand announced he would use money from his Revolution book to open a café, the Trew Era Cafe on the New Era estate in the London Borough of Hackney, which would employ recovering drug addicts. The café opened on 26 March 2015 and in September the following year Brand donated it to the Rehabilitation for Addicted Prisoners Trust. In March, readers of Prospect magazine voted Brand the fourth-most influential thinker in the world, behind Thomas Piketty, Yanis Varoufakis, and Naomi Klein.

The film documentary Brand: A Second Coming, which reflects on Brand's journey into political activism, premiered at the South by Southwest (SXSW) festival in Austin, Texas, in March 2015. Brand and director Michael Winterbottom worked together to produce a documentary, The Emperor's New Clothes, that had its international premiere on 24 April 2015 at the Tribeca Film Festival. The film features archival footage with appearances by Brand in London and New York City, examining the financial crisis of 2007–2008 and global economic inequality. The documentary is produced by Brand's Revolution Films company and distributed by StudioCanal UK.

On 29 April 2015, eight days ahead of 2015 UK general election, Brand published an interview with Labour leader Ed Miliband on an episode of The Trews as part of a Trews Politics Week series. Miliband stated that he took part to win over people like Brand who do not vote, although his opponent David Cameron deemed the entire interview a "joke". The following day Brand released an interview with Green Party leader Natalie Bennett and Green MP Caroline Lucas, giving his support to Lucas in Brighton advising people there to vote Green, adding that "In most cases it don’t matter if you don’t vote Green". He also criticised an election "set up not to represent people's wishes".

Following these interviews, three days before the election, Brand released the final episode of The Trews Politics Week entitled "Emergency: VOTE To Start Revolution" releasing additional material from his discussion with Ed Miliband and stating "I think we've got no choice but to take decisive action to end the danger of the Conservative party". He dropped his anti-voting position and "declared the importance of voting", backing Labour and telling his fans that "You gotta vote Labour", although he admitted "that he couldn't be sure of the reality of what a Labour government would mean". Brand was not registered to vote in the 2015 election.

On 20 August 2015, Brand released episode 366 of The Trews titled "Final Episode Of The Trews – Goodbye, Good Luck", which he said would be the final episode of the series. The Trews returned on 12 October 2016.

Brand endorsed Jeremy Corbyn in the 2015 Labour Party leadership election. Ahead of the 2017 United Kingdom general election, he wrote in The Huffington Post that Corbyn "has the qualities I want in a strong and stable leader". Regarding the 2015 election, he said: "You know I never actually said 'don't vote'? I said 'There's no point in voting when the main political parties are basically indistinguishable and the relationship between government, big business and factions of the media make it impossible for the democratic will of the people to be realised.'"

2020–present: COVID-19 pandemic and YouTube channel
During the COVID-19 pandemic, Brand's YouTube channel underwent an increase in activity and change in political direction veering heavily in the direction of COVID denialism and conspiracy theories, which led to an increase in popularity and has amassed more than 5.64 million subscribers and 726 million views. 

Due to having one of his videos taken down in September 2022 due to YouTube's policy on medical misinformation, he moved his channel to Rumble where he has launched a new daily live show, Stay Free with Russell Brand.

Controversies

On 16 September 2010, Brand was arrested on suspected battery charges after he allegedly attacked a paparazzo who blocked his and then-fiancée Katy Perry's way to catch a flight at Los Angeles International Airport. The paparazzo placed Brand under citizen's arrest until the police arrived and he was released from custody the next day after posting US$20,000 bail. On 15 March 2012, an arrest warrant was issued for Brand in New Orleans, U.S., because of allegations that he had thrown a photographer's mobile phone through a window. The paparazzo was taking pictures of Brand with an iPhone when Brand wrestled the device from his hands and tossed it at a law firm's window. The warrant cited "simple criminal damage to property", leading Brand, who offered to pay for the replacement of the window, to voluntarily appear at a police station. Brand was filming a movie in New Orleans at the time of the incident.

Brand was ejected from the GQ Awards show on 3 September 2013 after receiving the "Oracle" award. In his acceptance speech, he mentioned sponsor Hugo Boss's former business making uniforms for the Gestapo. Brand said of the Nazis, "They did look fucking fantastic, let's face it" before he goose stepped across the stage in a comical imitation of the Nazi march. Brand was eventually ejected from the event after GQ editor Dylan Jones confronted Brand with his view that the speech was "very offensive"—Brand replied by saying that the Nazis' treatment of the Jewish people was "very offensive". Brand later wrote an article about the award night for The Guardian:

Now I'm aware that this [GQ award speech] was really no big deal ... It was a daft joke by a daft comic at a daft event. It makes me wonder, though, how the relationships and power dynamics I witnessed on this relatively inconsequential context are replicated on a more significant scale ... Ought we be concerned that our rights to protest are being continually eroded under the guise of enhancing our safety? ... When you take a breath and look away from the spectacle it's amazing how absurd it seems when you look back.

In September 2021, Brand shared information on how to avoid COVID-19 safety measures for people attending his tour. In October 2021, YouTube began reviewing some of Brand's videos to see if they violated the site's COVID-19 vaccine policies. Columnist Charlotte Lytton accused Brand of pandering to the anti-vax movement as well as amplifying pro-Russian conspiracy theories with respect to the Russo-Ukrainian War. Elon Musk defended Brand from media criticism on Twitter, saying "With so many mainstream media companies saying @rustyrockets is crazy/dangerous, I watched some of his videos. Ironically, he seemed more balanced & insightful than those condemning him! The groupthink among major media companies is more troubling. There should be more dissent."

In 2022, Brand discussed the World Health Organization's meetings on the pandemic treaty and said: "I'll tell you what’s up… Your democracy is fucking finished" and that future people would say we "lapsed a terrible technocratic, globalist agenda." Also in 2022, Brand released a video decrying the media for ignoring reporting on the Canada convoy protest. Brand also said in the video that "Truckers, who were previously regarded as heroes when they were delivering vital goods and working during the lockdown, are now villains as they protest vaccine mandates".

Personal life
Brand has been diagnosed with attention deficit hyperactivity disorder (ADHD) and bipolar disorder. He also suffered from bulimia, pornography addiction, and experienced a period of self-harming. Brand has described the concept of fame as "like ashes" in his mouth.

Brand used to be a Buddhist; speaking to The Guardian in 2017 he said he believes in a higher power as described by Alcoholics Anonymous. Brand has shown interest in the Hare Krishna Movement and wrote in a 2007 Guardian column: "I say Hare Krishna as often as possible, sometimes even when I'm not being filmed". Additionally, during an interview on The Ellen DeGeneres Show in October 2010, Brand talked about his love of Transcendental Meditation (TM). This love of TM was reaffirmed in a 2013 New Statesman editorial he wrote: "Through Transcendental Meditation, twice daily I feel the bliss of the divine..... I connect to a boundless consciousness that has no palpable relationship with my thoughts, fears or desires." He has also gravitated towards Christian spirituality and practice by daily reciting the Lord's Prayer and attempting to have Christ consciousness.

In 2011, Brand served as best man at Noel Gallagher's wedding to Sara MacDonald.

Since 2016, Brand has been training in the martial art of Brazilian Jiu-Jitsu and has earned a purple belt in the discipline. He credits the art with improving his life in several ways.

Brand lives in Henley-on-Thames. He is a lifelong supporter of the West Ham United football club. As of 2019, he is a vegan.

Relationships
Brand first met American singer Katy Perry in mid-2009 when she filmed a cameo for his film Get Him to the Greek, although the cameo was cut from the film. They began dating after meeting again at the 2009 MTV Video Music Awards in September. The two became engaged on New Year's Eve 2009 during a holiday in India, and married there on 23 October 2010 in a Hindu ceremony, near the Ranthambhore tiger sanctuary in Rajasthan.

In October 2011, Brand and Perry announced via Twitter that they had switched to a vegan diet after watching the documentary Forks Over Knives which explores ways that plant-based diets can reduce risks for cardiovascular disease and other chronic conditions. On 30 December 2011, Brand filed for divorce, citing irreconcilable differences, which was finalised in July 2012. Perry's July 2012 autobiographical documentary, Katy Perry: Part of Me, revealed that conflicting career schedules and Perry not feeling ready to have children led to the end of their marriage. Perry later said in an interview that Brand did not like the idea of her "being the boss" of things, and that the last time she had heard from him was on 31 December 2011, when he text-messaged that he was divorcing her.

Days after his divorce was finalised, Brand said in an interview with Howard Stern that he was extremely in love with Perry, but after marrying her realised "this isn't really working out ... I was really, really in love with her, but it was difficult to see each other ... it mostly didn't work for practical reasons." While Stern pressed for details, Brand declined, saying: "I don't want anything to hurt her. She's younger than me, she's a young woman and she's beautiful and she's sensitive and I care about her deeply." Brand, who married Perry without a prenuptial agreement, was eligible to claim half of the estimated $44 million she earned during their marriage, but declined.

From 2013 to 2014, Brand was in a relationship with Jemima Goldsmith (f.k.a. Khan), an editor of the New Statesman, and a daughter of financier James Goldsmith. In May 2014, Brand received libel damages from The Sun after the paper had printed a story in November 2013 alleging that he had been unfaithful to Khan. Brand said he would be donating the unspecified damages to the Hillsborough Justice Campaign. Brand and Khan ended their relationship in September 2014.

In the October 2014 issue of Vanity Fair, Brand said of the allegations of misogyny made against him: "I have lived a life and had a frame of cultural references that make that charge quite legitimate... But as a person who's trying to live a decent, spiritual life, misogyny is not part of my current palette of behaviors... In a way, redemption is a great part of my narrative. I'm talking about disavowing previous lives, previous beliefs, previous behaviours."

Since 2015, Brand has been in a relationship with Scottish blogger and former restaurateur Laura Gallacher, whom he had dated on and off since 2007. Gallacher is the sister of television presenter Kirsty Gallacher. Their first daughter Mabel was born in November 2016. Brand married Gallacher in Henley-on-Thames on 26 August 2017. In July 2018, Brand and Gallacher had a second daughter named Peggy.

Substance use

The media published articles on Brand during his drug-using period, typically in relation to incidents, and his public profile has since been associated with this era. Drug-related issues led to Brand's arrest on twelve occasions. Brand was ejected from The Gilded Balloon in Edinburgh and following a subsequent show in the city in 2004, a reviewer stated that "you'd rather hug him than hit him", as he had embraced recovery by this point. Following the cessation of his use, Brand revealed through his stand-up performances that he introduced his drug dealer to Kylie Minogue during his time at MTV and masturbated a stranger in a public toilet for a television programme. In January 2014, Brand described his first experience with heroin as "blissful".

Brand has abstained from drug use since 13 December 2002. He was a patron of the Focus 12 drug treatment programme and rehabilitation charity after his own use of the service; the charity closed in 2018. Brand's sobriety was instigated by his agent, John Noel, after Brand was apprehended using heroin in a bathroom during a Christmas party. Brand cites his practice of transcendental meditation as a significant factor in his recovery from drug dependence. Brand organised three fundraisers for Focus 12 in London, Dublin and Belfast in 2009, and has also acted as a "sponsor" for numerous people during the rehabilitation stage of their treatment process.

Filmography

Film

Television

Awards

Stand-up DVDs
 Live ( 2006)
 Doing Life – Live ( 2007)
 Scandalous – Live at the O2 ( 2009)
 Live in New York City ( 2011)
 Messiah Complex ( 2013)
 Brandemic ( 2023)

Bibliography

Notes

References

Further reading

Interviews
 Caroline Frost, "Russell Brand Talks, Love, Sex, Ambition and Revolution", Herald Sun,  2009 (audio)
 Russell Brand on Revolution, Fighting Inequality, Addiction, Militarized Policing & Noam Chomsky. Democracy Now!   2014 (video)

External links

 
 

 
1975 births
21st-century English comedians
21st-century English male actors
21st-century English male writers
21st-century British screenwriters
21st-century English writers
21st-century essayists
Alumni of the Drama Centre London
Alumni of the Italia Conti Academy of Theatre Arts
BBC Radio 2 presenters
British drug policy reform activists
British male bloggers
British male comedy actors
British male television writers
British republicans
British socialists
British social commentators
Comedians from Essex
COVID-19 conspiracy theorists
English autobiographers
English bloggers
English comedy writers
English documentary filmmakers
English essayists
English expatriates in the United States
English film producers
English game show hosts
English male comedians
English male film actors
English male television actors
English non-fiction writers
English podcasters
English practitioners of Brazilian jiu-jitsu
English radio DJs
English stand-up comedians
English television presenters
English television writers
English video bloggers
English YouTubers
Labour Party (UK) people
Living people
Male actors from Essex
Male essayists
People from Grays, Essex
People with bipolar disorder
Shock jocks
Television personalities from Essex
The Guardian journalists
Writers from Essex
People with attention deficit hyperactivity disorder